Rainbow District School Board (known as English-language Public District School Board No. 3 prior to 1999) covers a geographic area of more than  in the heart of the Rainbow Country and is the largest public school board in Northern Ontario. The Board offers English language and French Immersion program to students from Kindergarten to Grade 12.

Rainbow District School Board is the largest school board in Northern Ontario with 30 elementary school buildings and 9 secondary school buildings in Sudbury, Espanola and Manitoulin.

The Board also offers other programs - Child and Adolescent Mental Health Program, Cecil Facer School, N’Swakamok Native Friendship Centre, Children's Treatment Centre, O’Connor Park, Applied Behaviour Analysis program, Restart, Simulated Healthy Independent Living Opportunities (SHILO) program, Attendance Centre, Mishko-Ode-Wendam, Northern Support Initiative, Frank Flowers School and Barrydowne College operating at Cambrian College.

Notable Alumni:
Shania Twain

List of elementary schools
A.B. Ellis Public School
Adamsdale Public School
Alexander Public School
Algonquin Road Public School
Assiginack Public School
Carl A. Nesbitt Public School
Central Manitoulin Public School
Charles C. McLean Public School
Chelmsford Public School
Churchill Public School
Copper Cliff Public School
C.R. Judd Public School
Ernie Checkeris Public School
Jean Hanson Public School
Lansdowne Public School
Larchwood Public School
Levack Public School
Little Current Public School
MacLeod Public School
Markstay Public School
Monetville Public School
Northeastern Elementary School
Princess Anne Public School
Queen Elizabeth II Public School
Redwood Acres Public School
R.H. Murray Public School
R.L. Beattie Public School
S. Geiger Public School
Valley View Public School
Walden Public School
Westmount Avenue Public School

List of secondary schools
Barrydowne College, Sudbury
Chelmsford Valley District Composite School, Chelmsford
Confederation Secondary School, Valley East
Espanola High School, Espanola
Lasalle Secondary School, Sudbury
Lively District Secondary School, Lively
Lockerby Composite School, Sudbury
Lo-Ellen Park Secondary School, Sudbury
Manitoulin Secondary School, M'Chigeeng
Sudbury Secondary School, Sudbury

See also
List of school districts in Ontario
List of high schools in Ontario

References

External links

Rainbow District School Board Official Website

School districts in Ontario
Education in Greater Sudbury